The Kraken is a legendary sea creature of gargantuan size, said to have been seen off the coasts of Norway and Iceland.

Kraken may also refer to:

Literature
 Kraken (novel), a 2010 novel by China Miéville
 "The Kraken", an 1830 poem by Alfred, Lord Tennyson
 Kraken, a hypothetical modern dinosaur in Dougal Dixon's 1988 book The New Dinosaurs: An Alternative Evolution
 Kraken, a book by Mary Turzillo
 The Kraken Wakes, a 1953 novel by John Wyndham
 The symbol of the Ironmen in the Game of Thrones / A Song of Ice and Fire fictional scenario

Sports
 Seattle Kraken, a National Hockey League team based in Seattle, Washington
 June Mar Fajardo (born 1989), Filipino basketball player nicknamed "Kraken" for his size
 Gary Sánchez (born 1992), Dominican baseball player nicknamed "the Kraken"

Film
 Kraken (Pirates of the Caribbean), sea monster in the Pirates of the Caribbean movie series
 Kraken: Tentacles of the Deep, 2006 TV movie that premiered on the Syfy Channel
 The Kraken, sea monster in Clash of the Titans (1981 film)
 The Kraken, sea monster in Clash of the Titans (2010 film)
 The Kraken, a character in the film Hotel Transylvania 3: Summer Vacation

Comics
 Kraken (comics), a Spanish comics series by Antonio Segura and Jordi Bernet
 Kraken (character), various Krakens that have appeared throughout the decades in comic book publications
 Kraken (Marvel Comics), various characters have appeared in Marvel Comics using the name
 Commander Kraken, a fictional character in the Marvel Universe
 Judge Kraken, character in the Judge Dredd comic strip in 2000 AD
 Kraken Isaac, character from Saint Seiya

Video and role playing games
 Kraken (Dungeons & Dragons), a creature in the role playing game
 The Kraken (Forgotten Realms), a secret society in the Forgotten Realms of Dungeons & Dragons
 Kraken, a giant red octopus in Sega's popular video game, The Ocean Hunter
 Kraken, one of the Four Fiends in the Final Fantasy series of video games
 The Kraken, a character in the PC game Crush, Crumble and Chomp!
 Kraken, an end level boss in the video game Shamu's Deep Sea Adventures
 Kraken, captain of the Skull Haven, a character in Capcom's Power Stone
 The Kraken, a sea-serpent boss in the SNES RPG, EarthBound
 The Kraken, a villain in the video game Marvel: Ultimate Alliance
 The Kraken, a playable character in the PC game Archon II: Adept
 The Kraken, a boss in Tomb Raider: Underworld
 Kraken, an enemy in the Clash of the Titans
 Kraken, an enemy in Indiana Jones and the Emperor's Tomb
 Kraken, a boss in the game God of War II
 Kraken, a boss in Lionhead Studios' Fable
 Kraken, a boss in the game Pac-Man Party
Kraken, a monster in the game Evolve

Other uses
 Kraken (virus), XBB.1.5 Covid virus subvariant
 Kraken Regiment, Ukrainian military volunteer unit
 Giant squid, commonly known as Kraken, or inspiring the legendary sea monster
 Kraken (genus), a genus of filose amoebae
 Kraken, a computing environment at the National Institute for Computational Sciences
 Kraken (band), a progressive metal band from Colombia
 Kraken (roller coaster), a roller coaster at Seaworld in Orlando, Florida
 Kraken (software test), a JavaScript test suite from Mozilla used in benchmarking web browser performance
 USS Kraken (SS-370), a United States submarine
 Kraken botnet, a botnet spyware program that attacks systems through email and social media sites
 Kraken Mare, the largest known body of liquid on the surface of Saturn's moon Titan
 Kraken (galaxy), a proposed galaxy that collided with the Milky Way around 11 billion years ago
 Kraken Rum, a Caribbean 94 proof black rum
 Kraken (company), a cryptocurrency exchange and bank
 Kraken and "release the Kraken", neologisms used by Sidney Powell that refer to post-election lawsuits related to the 2020 United States presidential election.
 GitKraken, a software company named after one of their products.

See also
 Kraken in popular culture